The 61st Evening Standard Theatre Awards were awarded on Sunday 22 November 2015 at the Old Vic Theatre in London. Nominations were announced on 2 November 2015. The ceremony was presented by Rob Brydon and co-hosted by Evening Standard owner Evgeny Lebedev, Dame Judi Dench and Sir Ian McKellen.

Non-competitive awards 
The Lebedev award went to American composer and lyricist Stephen Sondheim.

The Editor’s award, awarded in partnership with The Ivy, went to Vanessa Redgrave.

The V&A’s exhibition Alexander McQueen: Savage Beauty won the Beyond Theatre award.

Winners and nominees 

 The Best Musical award was awarded in partnership with BBC Radio 2 and voted for by the public.
 The Emerging Talent Award was awarded in partnership with Burberry.

See also 

 2015 Laurence Olivier Awards

References 

Evening Standard Theatre Awards ceremonies
2015 theatre awards
2015 awards in the United Kingdom
November 2015 events in the United Kingdom